Gunnison Valley may refer to:

Officially named landforms
 Gunnison Valley (Sanpete and Sevier counties, Utah), an unpopulated valley in central Utah, United States that is located primarily in southeastern Sanpete County, but extends south into northeastern Sevier County; the valley also spans between the Fishlake and Manti-La Sal national forests
 Gunnison Valley (Emery and Grand counties, Utah), a populated basin in eastern Utah, United States that is located in eastern Emery County and western Sevier County, just south of the Book Cliffs; the basin is bisected by the Green River that flows into the Colorado River

Unofficially named areas
 Gunnison Valley, an area in Colorado, United States that is related to the city of Gunnison and the Gunnison River; examples of this use include the Gunnison Valley Health Hospital, Gunnison Valley School, Gunnison Valley Technologies, all of which are located in Gunnison, Colorado
 Gunnison Valley, an area in Utah, United States that is related to the city of Gunnison and the Gunnison Reservoir; examples of this use include the Gunnison Valley High School, the Gunnison Valley Hospital, and the Gunnison Valley Gazette, all of which are located in Gunnison, Utah